Karl Hampus Zackrisson (born 24 August 1994 in Kinna) is a Swedish footballer who plays for Varbergs BoIS as a defender.

Club career

IFK Göteborg
Hampus Zackrisson started playing football with local side Skene IF, before he joined IFK Göteborg's youth academy in 2008. Zackrisson played his first Allsvenskan game in the 2013 season away at IF Brommapojkarna on July 13. He was also part of IFK's U19 team that became Swedish champions that year, after defeating AIK in the final. The following winter, IFK's coach Mikael Stahre described Zackrisson as a "loyal and good team player", and got offered a senior contract. On October 21, 2014, IFK Göteborg announced that Zackrisson won't be a part of the squad to the 2015 season.

Degerfors IF
On December 8, 2014, Zackrisson signed a 3-year-long contract with Superettan side Degerfors IF. Degerfors' coach Patrik Werner said that he saw Zackrisson foremost as a defender, rather than midfielder he often was used as in IFK Göteborg. Werner also praised him for his talent when he described Zackrisson as "one of the country's most promising players in that position".

He played 27 league games in his first season, and was later named as signing of the year by the local paper NWT.

International career
Zackrisson played two games for Sweden U19 national team in 2013.

Career statistics

References

External links
 
 
 

1994 births
Living people
Swedish footballers
Sweden youth international footballers
Allsvenskan players
Superettan players
IFK Göteborg players
Degerfors IF players
Varbergs BoIS players
Association football defenders